The Vieux Chaillol is a mountain in the Écrins National Park, located in Hautes-Alpes, southeastern France. It has an elevation of 3,163 Meters above sea level and forms a moderate to hard, full day hike from the starting point in the village of Chaillol 1600 or from the township of Saint-Michel-de-Chaillol.

References

Mountains of the Alps
Alpine three-thousanders
Mountains of Provence-Alpes-Côte d'Azur
Provence-Alpes-Côte d'Azur region articles needing translation from French Wikipedia